Emeritus professor Brian Stoddart is an Australian academic who was the vice-chancellor of La Trobe University between 2005 and 2006.  He is a well-known commentator on sporting matters, being involved in the foundation of the Australian Institute of Sport and being the author of many books exploring the history and importance of sports in society.

References

Year of birth missing (living people)
Living people
Academic staff of La Trobe University
Sports historians
Australian historians